Falsocis is a genus of beetles in the family Ciidae, containing the following species:

 Falsocis brasiliensis Lopes-Andrade, 2007
 Falsocis flavus Pic, 1922
 Falsocis opacus Pic, 1916

References

Ciidae genera